Beverwyck Brewing Company was formed in 1878 as Quinn and Nolan and was located at 30/52 North Ferry Street, in Albany, New York. The brewery produced beer from 1878 until prohibition in 1920. During prohibition Beverwyck had a license to produce non-alcoholic beverages. It was one of the three breweries in Albany to survive prohibition, the others being J.F. Hedrick and Dobler Brewing.

In 1933 Beverwyck re-opened with 6 products.   Beverwyck India Ale and Porter was produced from 1933 through 1944, while Beverwyck Ale, Bock, Beer and Irish Cream Ale were produced from 1933 to 1950 when the brewery was acquired by the F. & M. Schaefer Brewing Company of Brooklyn, New York.  F. & M. Schaefer closed the brewery in 1972.

In the mid-1940s the company added a streamlined bottling plant and stock house which nearly doubled the production capacity.

Bevewyck used the tag line “Beverwyck, Best Beer Brewed” and had as its logo a shield, with BBBB placed diagonally on the shield. The father of tenor Alfred Piccaver once worked as head brewer of the factory.

References

American beer brands
Defunct brewery companies of the United States
Beer brewing companies based in New York (state)
Defunct companies based in New York (state)
Food and drink companies established in 1878
Companies based in Albany, New York
Food and drink companies disestablished in 1972
1878 establishments in New York (state)
1972 disestablishments in New York (state)
American companies established in 1878